Harb is a predominantly Arabian tribe in the Arabian peninsula. It is originally a Qahtanite tribe. Several authentic sources on Arab tribes genealogy state that the great-grandfather of Harb tribe is Harb ibn Saad ibn Saad ibn Khawlan ibn Amr ibn Qadha'ah ibn Himyar ibn Qahtan. Harb tribal lands extend from the Red Sea coast in Tihamah (Western Part of Saudi Arabia) to the heart of Najd in the central region of Saudi Arabia, and from North the Harbi lands extend from Madinah (a holy city for Muslims) to Al Qunfudhah in the south. The tribe's reach extends to other countries like Kuwait, Iraq, Bahrain and UAE.

The origins of Harb tribe came from the 2nd century of the Islamic calendar. When Qahtani tribes emigrated from the south of Arabian Peninsula to Hejaz around 131 AH for water and land space after some battles with their cousins Banu Ar-Rabi'ah bin Saad. As a result, this caused several tribal conflicts with the native and mostly Adnani Arab tribes of Hejaz and Tihamah such as Juhaynah, Anazzah, Muzaynah, and Sulaym over land and water. After around three centuries in Hejaz, Harb tribe became a dominant tribe in the heart of Hejaz with territories surrounding the holy city of Medina. It is important to note that Harb now, like many other Arabian tribes, is a federation of tribes and families, a good example is that Muzaynah in Saudi Arabia are considered from Harb but it is well known that it was a tribe of its own with a known presence in Hejaz in the Pre-Islamic Arabia as well as the time of the Prophet Muhammad—i.e., before the origin of Harb tribe in Hejaz.

Currently, many of the tribe sons have migrated in recent decades to the three major metropolitan centers of Saudi Arabia, namely Riyadh, Jeddah, and Dammam, in search of better education and employment. One of the main branches of the tribe such as Banu Shaker left al Hejaz and set off to the west coasts of Palestine to start business in agriculture. For the coast of Palestine is well known all around the world for its fertile soil. Banu Shaker that trace there ancestry to Al Hassan Al Muthana are also known to be the Abunamous and Al Shaker Families from Yaffa or Jaffa have developed their reputation of being prominent landowners in Yaffa city.

Tribe Sections

As of 2019, the Harb tribe had two main sections, Banu Salim and Masrooh:

Masrooh
 Banu Amro (Al-Amri).
 Banu safar (Al-Safri).
 Alfaraduh (Al-Fraidi).
 Alwahub (Al-Wahbi).
 Alfhaudah (Al-Fhaidi).
 Alhsnan (Al-Haysoni).
 Banu Ali (Al-Alawi).
 Banu Awf (AlOufi, Al-lhilibi).
 Zubaid (Al-Zubaidi).
 Mukhallaf (Al-Mukhallafi).

Banu Salim

Maymoon
 Al-Ahamidah (Al-Ahmadi).
 Arhelah (Al-Rehaili).
 Wild Muhammad (Al-Muhammadi).
 Subh "As-Subiih" (As-Subhi).
 As-Surahah (As-Suraihi).
 Al-Matalihah (Al-Matlahi).
 Banu Amri (Al-Amri As-Salimi). 
 Al-Mahamid (Al-Mihmadi).
 Al-Gaydi (Al-Ga'ydi).
 Al-Hayadirah (Al-Haidari).
 Banu Yahya (Al-Yahyawi).
 Al-Mawari'ah (Al-Muwarra'i).
 Ar-Roothan (Ar-Ruwaithi).

Al-Marawihah
 Muzaynah (Al-Muzaini).
 Al-Nahaitah (Al-Naheet).
 Al-bisharyah (Al-Bishri).
 Al-Hawamilah (Al-Hawimili).
 Al-Areemat (Al-Oraimah).
 Al-Hisnan (Al-Hissni).
 Al-Oanah (Al-Onni).
 Al-Qussiyreen (Al-Qussiyri).
 Al-Sarabitah (Al-Surbati).
 Al-Habariyah (Al-Hubairi).
 Al-Maraween (Al-Marwani).
 Al-Hantam (Al-Hantami).
 Al-Quba'ah (Al-Quba'i).
 Al-Dubabeeq (Al-Dabbaqi).
 Al-subahah (Al-sabeehi).
 Al-Huraibiyah (Al-Huraibi).
 Al-Dhawahrah (Al-Dhahiri).
 Al-Balajiyah (Al-Ballaji).
 Al-Hujalah (Al-Hujaili).
 Al-Hawazim (Al-Hazmi).
 Al-Hunaitat (Al-Hunaiti).
 Al-Hananyah (Al-Hunaini).
 Al -Raddadah (Al-Raddadi).

Harb tribe outside the Arabian Peninsula
Several branches of the Harb tribe are spread outside their homeland by origin, most notably the Mahamid from the Muttalhah from Maymun from Banu Salem from Harb, as this tribe is widely spread in the Levant and some regions of Iraq and the Maghreb countries, as it formed an emirate in Jordan, specifically the Karak governorate, which was known as the Emirate of Mahamid And it ruled for a period of time prior to the alliance of tribes in Jordan over them and deterred their emirate, and there is a mountain in Jordan in the Ajloun governorate called Jabal Bani Awf in reference to the Auf from Harb tribe.

And there is in Palestine in Beersheba a branch of the Harb tribe allied with the Azazma tribe.

They refer to themselves as the Mohammedans in relation to their grandfather Hamad bin Suleiman (in another narration Muhammad), and not to the Mahamid for lack of confusion due to the presence of their cousins from Mahamid Bani Salem who were in Jordan, specifically in its south at the time.

The Mahamid who are in Sudan and the countries of the Maghreb, who traveled with their alliance from the Bani Salim tribe, who neighboring and allied with it during their migration and travel to the north, and it is one of the largest tribes present there.

Traditions and Folklore
Harb Tribe has a very rich traditions and Folklore, tribe law, and folklore. Harbis practice several folkloric dances in their festivals, harvest celebrations -in the past and especially the Date Harvest-, and in Eids (Muslim Festivals). These Folkloric dances include, Khubaiti, Bidwani, ḥirabi, Zaid Al-ʾarḍhah Al-ḥarbiyah, and Zeer.

Notable people
Among the tribe's members are:

 Abdel Mohsin Musellem, Saudi poet and writer
 Dalal bint Mukhled Al-Harbi, Saudi historian 
 Saleh Al Maghamsi, Saudi Sunni religious scholar and former imam of the Quba Mosque
 Hamad Al-Jassir, prominent Saudi journalist and historian
 Abdul Aziz al-Harbi, Saudi Islamic scholar and associate professor at Umm al-Qura University

See also

 Tribes of Arabia.
 Bedouin.

References

External links

Bedouin groups
Qahtanites
Tribes of Arabia
Tribes of Jordan
Tribes of Iraq
Tribes of Kuwait
Tribes of Saudi Arabia
Tribes of Syria
Tribes of the United Arab Emirates